James Fry is an Australian writer.

Career
Fry graduated from university with a Bachelor of Social Science in Psychology and Graduate Certificate in Criminology and Criminal Justice.

In his debut memoir, That Fry Boy, Fry writes about growing up in suburban Sydney.

Bibliography

 That Fry Boy, Sydney, 2015,

References

External links
 

1982 births
Living people
21st-century Australian novelists
Australian male novelists
Australian memoirists
21st-century Australian male writers
21st-century memoirists
Australian male non-fiction writers